William Daniel Lickiss  (31 July 1924 – 22 February 1993) was an Australian politician.

Early life
He was born in Sydney to William George Lickiss and Lillian Rita, née Green. He attended Clempton Park Public School and Canterbury Boys High School before the family moved to Brisbane. He studied at the University of Queensland and became a draftsman with the Queensland Survey Office and then the Department of Territories in Darwin. During World War II he served in the Royal Australian Air Force as a navigator and intelligence officer. Returning to Queensland, he farmed sugarcane and pineapples and joined the Liberal Party.

Political career
In 1963 he was elected to the Queensland Legislative Assembly as the member for Mount Coot-tha.

On 10 March 1975, he was appointed to the Cabinet as Minister for Survey, Valuation, Urban and Regional Affairs, with a further promotion to Attorney-General and Minister for Justice on 13 August 1976. He lost his Cabinet position in 1980 but became Deputy Leader of the Liberal Party in 1983, serving until 1986. In that year, after a redistribution split the seat of Mount Coot-tha, he became the first member for Moggill. He retired from politics in 1989.

Personal life
On 3 October 1975, he was awarded the Queen's Gallantry Medal for his efforts to rescue a soldier during the flooding in Brisbane the previous year.

As at 1977, he was a Fellow of the Commonwealth Institute of Valuers, Australian Institute of Cartographers and the Royal Australian Planning Institute.

Lickiss died in Brisbane in 1993.

References

1924 births
1993 deaths
Liberal Party of Australia members of the Parliament of Queensland
Members of the Queensland Legislative Assembly
Recipients of the Queen's Gallantry Medal
Attorneys-General of Queensland
20th-century Australian politicians
Royal Australian Air Force personnel of World War II
Royal Australian Air Force officers